Char-ron Dorsey (born November 5, 1977) is a former American football offensive tackle in the National Football League for the Dallas Cowboys and Houston Texans. He was drafted in the seventh round of the 2001 NFL Draft. He played college football at Florida State University

Early years
Dorsey attended Bolles School, where he was a defensive tackle and a three-time first-team Class 4A All-State selection. As a senior, he registered 70 tackles (40 solo). He also played power forward in basketball.

He accepted a football scholarship from Florida State University. As a true freshman, he played in six games at defensive tackle, registering 11 tackles and one sack. 

As a sophomore, he was converted into an offensive tackle. He competed for the starting role at right tackle until suffering a season-ending neck injury. 

As a junior, he was demoted to third-string after having problems maintaining his playing weight, but eventually earned his way to back up Tarlos Thomas at right tackle in a season when the team won a national championship. 

As a senior, he received All-ACC honors and became a starter at right tackle ahead of sophomore Brett Williams, while helping quarterback Chris Weinke win the Heisman Trophy.

Professional career

Dallas Cowboys
Dorsey was selected in the seventh round (242nd overall) of the 2001 NFL Draft by the Dallas Cowboys, after dropping because of a poor showing in the NFL scouting combine. Although he was working with the first-unit at left tackle, he abruptly left training camp after feeling pressure from the coaches to reduce his weight (he showed up at almost 390 pounds) and improve his performance, but was later convinced to come back. 

He started the last two games of the season at right tackle in place of an injured Solomon Page. On September 9, 2002, he was waived after not being able to control his weight problems and not getting himself into better playing shape.

Houston Texans
On September 14, 2002, he was signed by the expansion team the Houston Texans. He was released on November 29, after being declared inactive in 5 games.

New York Giants
On January 7, 2003, he signed as a free agent with the New York Giants. He was placed on the physically unable to perform list while he recovered from off-season knee surgery. On August 19, he was waived injured after missing all of training camp recovering from the surgery.

Personal life
Dorsey was the football head coach at Matthew Gilbert Middle School, before accepting the same position at Andrew Jackson High School in 2011. In 2013, he resigned after compiling a 6-13 record and returned to Gilbert as the team's offensive coordinator.

He worked as a security guard at Andrew A. Robinson Elementary School and as a football coach for the Mentors of Tomorrow (MOT) Cowboys in Jacksonville, Florida.

His father Charlie Dorsey signed as a free agent with the Kansas City Royals and was a three-time All-league tight end with the Jacksonville Firebirds of the American Football Association.

References

External links
Fewer pounds mean more time for Dorsey

1977 births
Living people
American football offensive tackles
Dallas Cowboys players
Florida State Seminoles football players
Houston Texans players
Bolles School alumni
High school football coaches in Florida
People from Jacksonville, Florida
Players of American football from Florida